In Greek mythology, Hypate  (Ὑπάτη) was one of the three Muses of the lyre who were worshipped at Delphi, where the Temple of Apollo and the Oracle were located. Her name was also the highest of the seven notes of the lyre. Her sisters who were worshipped along with her were Nete and Mese. These three muses were comparable to the original three, Aoide, Melete, and Mneme. Alternatively, they were Cephisso, Apollonis, and Borysthenis, which portrayed them as the daughters of Apollo.

Place name
The name of the ancient city Hypate (now Ypati, a village in Phthiotis west of Lamia) is unrelated to this Muse. It has a different etymology meaning "the height of Oeta (Oiti)".

References

Greek Muses